The Siberian Nuclear Power Plant (Sibirskaya Nuclear Power Plant) was built in the city of Seversk (then known as Tomsk-7), Tomsk Oblast. It was the second nuclear power plant in the USSR and the first industrial-scale nuclear power plant in the country (the first NPP, built in Obninsk, had a capacity of only 6 MW). While the Siberian Nuclear Power Plant did produce electricity, the primary product was weapons-grade plutonium for the Soviet Union's nuclear weapons program

References

A Brief History of: The Tomsk-7 is Nuclear Excursion (Short Documentary)

Former nuclear power stations in Russia
Nuclear power stations built in the Soviet Union